William Alexander Johnson (born December 4, 1964) is a former professional Canadian football defensive lineman who played nine seasons in the Canadian Football League (CFL), mainly for the Calgary Stampeders. Johnson was a five-time All-Star and won a Grey Cup with Calgary in 1992. He started his career in the NFL, playing for the Chicago Bears in 1987, where he was a linebacker.

He was inducted into the Canadian Football Hall of Fame as a player in 2021.

References 

1964 births
Living people
American football linebackers
Calgary Stampeders players
Canadian football defensive linemen
Chicago Bears players
Louisiana–Monroe Warhawks football players
Sportspeople from Monroe, Louisiana
Players of American football from Louisiana
Saskatchewan Roughriders players
Canadian Football Hall of Fame inductees